Guohua Taishan Power Station is a coal-fired power station in Taishan, Jiangmen, Guangdong, China. With an installed capacity of 5,000 MW, it is the 7th largest coal-fired power station in the world. (It shares this title with the Guodian Beilun, Jiaxing, and Waigaoqiao power stations).

See also 

 List of coal power stations
 List of largest power stations in the world
 List of power stations in China

References

Buildings and structures in Guangdong
Coal-fired power stations in China